The General Electric TF39 was a high-bypass turbofan engine that was developed to power the Lockheed C-5 Galaxy. The TF39 was the first high-power, high-bypass jet engine developed. The TF39 was further developed into the CF6 series of engines, and formed the basis of the LM2500 and LM6000 marine and industrial gas turbine. On September 7, 2017, the last active C-5A powered with TF39 engines made its final flight to Davis-Monthan Air Force Base for retirement. The TF39 was effectively retired, and all remaining active C-5 Galaxys are now powered by F138 (General Electric CF6-80C2) engines.

Development
The United States Air Force opened the "CX-X Program" in 1964, intending to produce a next-generation strategic airlifter. Of the several airframe and engine proposals returned for consideration, Lockheed's aircraft and General Electric's engine were selected for the new design in 1965.

The high-bypass turbofan was a huge leap in engine performance, offering a thrust of 43,000 pounds, while improving fuel efficiency by about 25%. The TF39 had an 8:1 bypass ratio, a 25:1 compressor pressure ratio, and a 2,500 °F (1,370 °C) turbine temperature made possible by advanced forced-air cooling. The first engine went for testing in 1965. Between 1968 and 1971, 463 TF39-1 and -1A engines were produced and delivered to power the C-5A fleet.

Design

The TF39 was a revolutionary 1960s engine rated from 41,000 to 43,000 lbf (191 to 205 kN) of thrust. It introduced use of a large by-pass ratio which, together with advances in core technology, contributed to a significant improvement in fuel efficiency over engines available at the time.

The engine included features developed from previous GE engines:
 Variable stator vanes (used in the J79/CJ805)
 Turbine cooling techniques (advanced from the J93 used in the XB-70)
 Cascade-type thrust reverser (from the CJ805)
 Snubbered first stage fan blades (snubbers, or mid-span shrouds, had been introduced by GE on the YJ93 first stage compressor blades)

Today, a conventional turbofan featuring a T-staged fan would have an overhung fan rotor (without any inlet guide vanes), followed by one or more T-stages supercharging the core stream alone. The name T-staged fan is derived from the overall appearance of the LP compressor when the side elevation is shown diagrammatically.

GE took a different approach with their first high bypass ratio turbofan, the TF39. It is a unique, very complex design. The T-stage, which supercharges the core stream, is located ahead of the main fan rotor. The T-stage itself comprises an overhung mini-rotor followed by a set of outlet guide vanes; the main fan rotor is located immediately behind these OGVs. Outboard of the T-stage rotor are the main inlet guide vanes, which only affect the bypass stream. The T-stage rotor extends to about half the main rotor stage annulus and runs in a tip shroud. The main fan stage has a mid-span platform/flow splitter which separates the single-stage outer annulus from the two-stage inner annulus. These two stages mainly supercharge the 16-stage high-pressure compressor. However, a fair proportion of the air entering the T-stage is bled off into the bypass duct, there being two annular passages leading to the bypass duct. The nominal bypass ratio of 8:1 refers to the ratio of total bypass mass flow to HP compressor entry mass flow.

The rotor blades are snubbered. 'Snubbers' are protuberances that stick out at right angles to the fan aerofoil at mid to 2/3 span. At speed, the snubbers on adjacent fan blades butt-up against each other to prevent blade failures due to flutter. They, together with the second-stage inlet guide vanes in the outer half of the duct, are visible when looking into the engine intake.

The high-bypass ratio of 8:1 for the TF-39 had its origins in the lift-fan technology demonstrated by GE in the XV-5 Vertifan aircraft. This aircraft had two X353-5 engines, each consisting of a 62.5-inch-diameter lift-fan driven by a gas generator (J85). The bpr in VTOL operation was 12.3. This tip-turbine driven lift-fan concept was turned 90 degrees and developed as an 80-inch-diameter "cruise fan" demonstrator, driven by a J79 gas generator. For the CX-X program GE demonstrated a half-scale engine, the GE1/6, with 15,830 lb thrust and an sfc of 0.336. This was developed into the TF39 with a 97 in diameter fan.

Applications
 Lockheed C-5A/B/C Galaxy

Specifications (TF39-1C)

See also

References

External links

 General Electric TF39 website

High-bypass turbofan engines
TF39
1960s turbofan engines